Party Over Here is an American sketch comedy television series created by Paul Scheer and The Lonely Island, who serve as executive producers. It premiered on Fox on March 12, 2016. It was the first original live-action program carried in Saturday late night by Fox after the cancellation of The Wanda Sykes Show in 2010. This was also the second female-led sketch comedy show to be aired on Fox, the first was The Tracey Ullman Show in 1987.

On August 9, 2016, Fox cancelled the series after one season.

Cast
 Nicole Byer
 Jessica McKenna
 Alison Rich

Featured players
 Marques Ray
 Carl Tart

Development and production
On December 3, 2014, it was announced that Paul Scheer and The Lonely Island created a new sketch series for Fox called Party Over Here as a part of The Lonely Island's overall development deal with the network. On February 4, 2016, Fox announced that the half-hour series would debut on Saturday, March 12, and that Scheer would serve as show runner and as one of the directors of the series. Nicole Byer, Jessica McKenna and Alison Rich were cast.

Crew
Writers
Nick Wiger - Head writer
Heather Anne Campbell
Lauren McGuire
Ryan Perez
Yamara Taylor

Directors
Danny Jelinek
Rachel Goldenberg - Segment director
Paul Scheer - Segment director

Broadcast
In most markets the scheduling of the series at 11 p.m. ET/PT, 10 p.m. CT/MT means it would have, specifically by producer's preference, not have gone against Saturday Night Live (the other half-hour of Fox's late night timeslot will carry a repeat of Cooper Barrett's Guide to Surviving Life), with the members of The Lonely Island receiving the blessing of SNL creator Lorne Michaels to bring the show forward under that condition. However, in markets where the local Fox affiliate carries a late local newscast at 11 p.m ET./10 p.m. CT, the series was delayed to air within the first half-hour of SNL.

Episodes

References

External links
 
 

2016 American television series debuts
2016 American television series endings
2010s American sketch comedy television series
2010s American late-night television series
English-language television shows
Fox late-night programming